New Times has several uses including:

Publications 
There are several publications including New Times in their names:
 New Times (Adelaide), official publication of the South Australian Synod of the Uniting Church in Australia
 New Times (magazine), a bi-weekly American magazine published in the 1970s
 New Times Media, a former US publisher of alternative weekly newspapers
 New Times Broward-Palm Beach, a newspaper published by Village Voice Media
 Miami New Times, a newspaper published by Village Voice Media
 Phoenix New Times, a newspaper published by Village Voice Media
 New Times LA, a defunct newspaper formerly published by New Times Media
 New Times (San Luis Obispo), an alternative weekly newspaper
 New Times (Minneapolis), a socialist newspaper from Minneapolis, Minnesota from the 1920s
 Syracuse New Times, a weekly alternative newspaper published in Syracuse, New York by Arthur Zimmer
 The New Times (Rwanda), a daily national newspaper published in Kigali, Rwanda

These publications have names that translate to English as New Times:
 Novoye Vremya (The New Times), a daily newspaper published in Russia from 1868 to 1914
 The New Times, a politically independent magazine published in Russia from 1943
 Nový čas (New Time), a daily Slovak tabloid newspaper
 Novy Chas (New Time), an independent weekly Belarusian newspaper

Other 
 New Times (album) is an album released in 1994 by Violent Femmes
 New Times (Armenia), an Armenian political party
 New Times (politics), a British intellectual movement of the 1980s
 Nuevo Tiempo (New Times), a South American TV station
 Un Nuevo Tiempo (A New Era), a political party in Venezuela